Yiwa was one of the 24 ancient Oghuz (Turkoman) tribes. The Yiwa tribe belonged to the tribe of Dengiz Khan, the youngest son of Oghuz Khagan. 

Part of the Yiwa, led by Suleyman Shah, moved from Central Asia to Western Iran and the upper reaches of Tigris and Euphrates in the 13th century. The capital of Suleyman Shah became the city of Bahar (near Hamadan). Suleyman Shah led the defense of Baghdad against the Mongols of Hulagu and was defeated.

History 
By the 14th century, the Yiwa had established a foothold in eastern Anatolia, and took possession of the area comprising the Van Lake and the surroundings of Mosul.

Qara Qoyunlu 

The Qara Qoyunlu rulers descended from the Yiwa tribe, specifically the Baharlu tribe.

Yiwa today 
Descendants of the Yiwa tribe are assimilated into Azerbaijani, Turkish and Turkmen turks. Sizable group of the Yiwa, mostly ethnic Turkmens, also live in the Olat region of Bukhara, Uzbekistan.

References

Yiwa tribe